The R363 road is a regional road in Ireland linking Newbridge, County Galway to the R362 west of Athlone. It passes through Ballynamore Bridge where it crosses the River Shiven. It then crosses the River Suck into County Roscommon at Ballyforan and goes through Dysart, County Roscommon before terminating. 

See also
Roads in Ireland
National primary road
National secondary road

References
Roads Act 1993 (Classification of Regional Roads) Order 2006 – Department of Transport

Regional roads in the Republic of Ireland
Roads in County Roscommon
Roads in County Galway